Thea Roland or The Adventure of Thea Roland (German: Das Abenteuer der Thea Roland) is a 1932 German comedy film directed by Henry Koster and starring Lil Dagover, Hans Rehmann and Margarete Kupfer. The film marked the directorial debut of Koster, who was forced to emigrate from Germany by the Nazi party following his next film and later went on to be a leading Hollywood director. Billy Wilder may have also worked on the screenplay, although he remained uncredited.

Partial cast
 Lil Dagover as Thea Roland 
 Hans Rehmann as Jerry Simpson 
 Margarete Kupfer as Anna 
 Paul Bildt as Professor Maschke 
 Walter Steinbeck as Bing  
 Olly Gebauer as Irene  
 Kurt Vespermann as Merkel - Journalist  
 Ernst Senesch as Trainingsleiter 
 Margot Landa as Elli - Blumenmädchen (flower girl)

References

Bibliography 
 Bock, Hans-Michael & Bergfelder, Tim. The Concise CineGraph. Encyclopedia of German Cinema. Berghahn Books, 2009. 
 Sikov, Ed. On Sunset Boulevard: The Life and Times of Billy Wilder. Hyperion, 1999.

External links 
 

1932 films
Films of the Weimar Republic
German comedy films
German black-and-white films
1932 comedy films
1930s German-language films
Films directed by Henry Koster
1930s German films